Carleen Cassandra Anderson (born May 10, 1957) is an American singer and musician. She is known for her work with the Young Disciples and numerous collaborations. Her distinguished solo career began in 1992. She is the acclaimed composer, writer and producer of futuristic operas. Carleen Anderson is the daughter of the singer Vicki Anderson, stepdaughter of Bobby Byrd and goddaughter of James Brown.

By the time Anderson was three years old, she was singing solos in front of the congregation. By the age of seven, she was playing piano by ear, directing the church choir and writing songs every week for the choir to sing before her grandfather delivered his Sunday sermons. Anderson’s vocal skills were influenced by her paternal aunt, Betty Faye Anderson, a Juilliard scholar, Gospel singer and the Chicago Symphony Orchestra’s first soprano soloist. Her uncle, David Anderson Jr., and his daughters, Pamela and Jhelisa, along with their mother, Yvonne, had a very successful family gospel singing group that travelled the southern United States. Anderson's birth father, Dr. Reuben Anderson Sr., is pastor of the Tower of Faith Evangelistic Church of God in Christ, in Compton California. Her birth mother singer Vicki Anderson featured with James Brown during the 1960s and 1970s. Vicki Anderson (birth name, Myra Barnes) married Bobby Byrd (musician, producer, bandleader, singer and childhood friend of James Brown). Byrd formed a group with James Brown in the late 1950s called The Flames, which was later named James Brown & The Famous Flames.

Education
After a brief marriage that resulted in the 1979 birth of her son, Bobby Anderson, Carleen Anderson lived as a divorced single mother in Los Angeles. She received several scholarships to study classical and jazz music performance, as well as music education, at Los Angeles City College (LACC) and the University of Southern California (USC). Anderson also studied Creative Literature at the University of California in Los Angeles (UCLA). During her studies, Anderson worked as a student tutor to support herself and her child. Anderson's goal at the time was to become a teacher of music, but her plans were thwarted when the Ronald Reagan administration removed Arts from the curriculum in government-sponsored schools. With only one semester left before completing her music degree, Anderson was forced to take office-clerk jobs to make ends meet.

Career
Anderson's first solo recording contract was with Virgin Records' Circa label. The initial marketing release was the EP Dusky Sappho in 1993. The freshman album True Spirit, released in 1994, had pop chart success with single releases "Mama Said", "Let It Last" and "Nervous Breakdown".

Anderson's 1998 second solo album, Blessed Burden, gained commercial recognition with singles "Woman in Me" and a cover of Paul McCartney’s "Maybe I’m Amazed".

Alberta’s Granddaughter was Anderson’s first independent and third solo album, released in 2002 on her own label, Dusky Sappho. This work included a cover of Noel Gallagher’s "Don’t Look Back in Anger", a much-noted, music industry-favoured version.

Anderson’s fourth solo album, Grace and Favours, was recorded live at the Glee Club in Birmingham, England. It was released in 2003 by Orange Room Music on CD and DVD formats with clips that include interviews and impromptu performances with James Brown and Paul Weller.

Universal Records released her fifth solo offering, Up to Now, in 2004. It was a compilation of songs over her career up to that date.

Her sixth album, Soul Providence, was released on Dome Records in 2005. It featured her song “My Door is Open”, which was remixed by Richard Earnshaw in 2010 as a dance floor production and was featured on Earnshaw’s album, In Time.

From 2002 to 2007 Anderson taught and was Head of the Vocal Department at Brighton Institute of Modern Music (BIMM). She had a bi-annual residency at Ronnie Scott’s Jazz Club in Soho, performing to packed audiences from 2006 to 2015. She sang a varied repertoire of jazz classics, musical theatre and unreleased material, as well as her commercial hits. In March 2007, in celebration of International Women’s Day, Anderson had the honour of singing for Her Majesty The Queen.

In 2014 Arts Council England awarded Anderson a grant to produce her Tribal Opera Cage Street Memorial. In 2015 she also received a grant from PRS Women Make Music to record her compositions from Cage Street Memorial, released as her seventh album on Freestyle Records in 2016. A Barbican Theatre stage production of the album in 2018 earned her a JazzFM Innovation of the Year nomination.

In 2019 Anderson became an Associate Artist at Hall for Cornwall in Truro. She was Choir Director for the BBC Singers and UK Vocal Assembly at the Royal Albert Hall for the August 2019 “Sacred Music” tribute to Duke Ellington at the BBC Proms and contributed to the performance as vocal arranger and curator. In June 2020 Anderson composed the music and was the featured vocalist and narrator for the BBC Radio 4 adaptation of Harlem Renaissance author Jean Toomer's Cane, Drama of the Week in the BBC Sounds Electric Decade series.

Work in Progress
In March 2020, Arts Council England awarded Anderson a grant to develop her second theatre piece, Melior, in partnership with Hall for Cornwall, Falmouth University and its Academy of Music and Theatre Arts (AMATA). Due to Covid-19 restrictions, the music from this ocean-themed time-travel fantasy will be released online in anticipation of its live premiere and subsequent tour. Melior introduces Anderson’s new music performance style, “Opus Griot”, a blend of storytelling, singing, poetry, visual art and music ensemble accompaniment. It features the new gesture-controlled digital instrument developed by Imogen Heap, MI.MU Gloves.

Discography

With Young Disciples
 Road to Freedom (Talkin' Loud, 1991)

Solo recordings
 Dusky Sappho EP (Circa/Virgin, 1994) No. 38 (this EP was classed as a mini-album as it had too many tracks on it to chart as a single)
 True Spirit (Circa/Virgin, 1994) UK No. 12
 True Spirit - Remixes (Circa/Virgin, 1995)
 Blessed Burden (Circa/Virgin, 1998) UK No. 51
 Alberta's Granddaughter (Dusky Sappho Music, 2002)
 Grace and Favours  (live performance DVD/CD, 2004)
 Up To Now: The Best Of (Virgin, 2004)
 Soul Providence (Dome, 2005)
 Cage Street Memorial - The Pilgrimage (Freestyle, 2016)

Solo singles
 "Nervous Breakdown" (1994) UK No. 27
 "Mama Said" (1994) UK No. 26
 "True Spirit" (1994) UK No. 24
 "Let It Last" (1995) UK No. 16
 "Maybe I'm Amazed" (1998) UK No. 24
 "Woman in Me" (1998) UK No. 74
 "Don't Look Back in Anger" (2002)

Under the alias Mardou Fox
 Subterraneans feat. Mardou Fox "Taurus Woman" (1993)
 Numbers "Ballad of Mardou Fox", "Traffic", "Mardous Lament", "Jack Summerset" (2001)

Collaborations
 Duet with Omar "Who Chooses the Seasons" (1992)
 Guru's Jazzmatazz, Vol. 1 "Sights in the City" (1993)
 Incognito "Trouble Don't Always Last"  (1994) (with Ramsey Lewis)
 Duet with Lewis Taylor "18 With a Bullet" (1998)
 Red, Hot + Cool Documentary (1998)
 The Brand New Heavies "Saturday Nite", "Apparently Nothing", "Try My Love", "Swinging Big Tom"
 The London Community Gospel Choir "Whenever You Call" (2001)
 Agent K. "Ride Away Getaway" (2002)
 Andy Hamill "Falling" (2003) (with Tony Woods)
 Full Flava's album Colour of My Soul, Carlen performs lead vocals on "Stories" and "You Are (My Destiny)" (2003)
 The London Community Gospel Choir "I Surrender All"  (2003)
 Courtney Pine "When The World Turns Blue" (2003)
 Mamayo "The Game" "Born to Love" (2005)
 Hope Collective "Give and Let Live" (2005)
 Duet with Paul Weller "Wanna Be Where You Are" (2005)
 Duet with Jocelyn Brown "Parting the Waters" (2005)
 Incognito "Show Me Love" (2005)
 Incognito "Summer in the City", "Tin Man", "That's the Way of the World" (2006)
 Shuya Okino features Carleen on their co-write of “Beautiful Sadness” (2006)
 Full Flava album Music Is Our Way Of Life. Carleen performs lead vocals on a cover of Jean Carne's Was That All It Was. (2007)
 "Bird in Flight" Tuff Scout Records, written by Gil Cang and Carleen Anderson (2014)
 "Grains of Dust" Welsh National Opera Songs of Occupation Protest (2014)

References

External links

 – official site

American expatriates in England
Living people
American rhythm and blues musicians
1957 births
Musicians from Houston
21st-century American women singers
21st-century American singers
The Brand New Heavies members